A statue of Frances Xavier Cabrini was unveiled in Manhattan in 2020.

References

Monuments and memorials in New York City
Sculptures of women in New York City
Statues in New York City